Evergreen Cemetery is the city-maintained cemetery for Colorado Springs, Colorado, on the National Register of Historic Places in El Paso County, Colorado.

When Colorado Springs was founded in 1871 there were already two cemeteries serving El Paso County but both were quickly found to be inadequate in serving the needs of the rapidly growing city. In 1874, the founder of Colorado Springs, General William Jackson Palmer, founded a new cemetery two miles from town. The original names were the Mount Washington or Mountain Home Cemetery. In 1877, the name was changed to Evergreen Cemetery. In 1875, the original  or so was deeded to the city of Colorado Springs and it has been a city owned and operated cemetery since then. In 1993 the cemetery was placed on the National Register of Historic Places.

Evergreen Cemetery is the burial place of many of the people that built the city of Colorado Springs along with founders of many neighboring cities. It is also the burial place of many of the people that made millions from the last Colorado gold rush, world renowned artists, writers and composers, philanthropists, captains of industry and business, Union and Confederate soldiers, sports figures, politicians, actors, and even an astronaut.

Notable burials
 Gretchen "Gretta" McRae (1898–1978), civil rights activist, writer
 William Jackson Palmer (1836–1909), railroad builder, city father
 Winfield Scott Stratton (1848–1902), mine owner, philanthropist
 James Ferguson Burns (1853–1917), mine owner, philanthropist
 Edward William Purvis (1857–1888), British officer and Hawaiian official
 Francis Henry Maynard (1853–1926), cowboy, author
 Franklin Eli Brooks (1860–1916), politician
 William H. Gill (1886–1976), Major general, U.S. Army
 Leo Arthur Hoegh (1908–2000), military figure
 Helen Hunt Jackson (1830–1885), activist
 Bob Johnson (ice hockey, born 1931) (1931–1991), hockey coach
 Stan Keller (1907–1990), bandleader
 Floyd K. Lindstrom (1912–1944), military figure
 John Franklin Forrest (1927–1997), military figure
 Robert Williamson Steele (1820–1901), territorial governor
 Marshall Sprague (1909–1994), author
 Dale Gardner (1948–2014), astronaut
 Frederick Phillips Raynham (1893–1954), British aviator
 Vic Heyliger (1912–2006), hockey player and coach
 Harry Hunter Seldomridge (1864–1927), politician
 Allen Tupper True (1881–1955), illustrator
 Stephanie Westerfeld (1943–1961), figure skater
 Sharon Westerfeld (1935–1961), sister of Stephanie Westerfeld
 Andy Adams (writer) (1859–1935), writer
 Pat Brady (1914–1972), actor
 Irving Howbert (1846–1934), public servant, businessman
 Sherman Coolidge (1862–1932), Episcopal Church priest, Indian advocate
 Roland W. Reed (Royal Jr.) (1864–1934), artist, photographer
 Hildreth Frost (1880–1955), Captain in Colorado National Guard during Colorado Coalfield War.
 Gerald Lippiatt (1874–1913), union organizer killed in the early stages of the Colorado Coalfield War.
 One Commonwealth war grave, of a Canadian Army soldier of World War I.

See also
 National Register of Historic Places listings in El Paso County, Colorado
 Fairview Cemetery (Colorado Springs, Colorado)

References

External links
 

1871 establishments in Colorado Territory
Buildings and structures in Colorado Springs, Colorado
Cemeteries on the National Register of Historic Places in Colorado
Romanesque Revival architecture in Colorado
National Register of Historic Places in Colorado Springs, Colorado
Cemeteries established in the 1870s